Sentianivka is an urban-type settlement in Alchevsk Raion of Luhansk Oblast in eastern Ukraine, at about 43 km WNW from the centre of Luhansk city, on the banks of the Luhan River. Population: 

The settlement was taken under control of pro-Russian forces during the War in Donbass, that started in mid-April 2014.

Demographics
In 2001 the settlement had 3,752 inhabitants. Native language as of the Ukrainian Census of 2001:
Ukrainian — 61.0+%
Russian — 37.87%
Others — 1.04%

References

Urban-type settlements in Alchevsk Raion